The 1991 Atlantic 10 Conference Baseball Championship was held at Bear Stadium in Boyertown, Pennsylvania from May 10 through 12. The double elimination tournament featured the top two regular-season finishers from both of the league's divisions. East top seed Rutgers defeated Massachusetts in the title game to win the tournament for the fifth time, earning the Atlantic 10's automatic bid to the 1991 NCAA Tournament.

Seeding and format 
Each division's top teams, based on winning percentage in the 16-game regular season schedule, qualified for the field. In the opening round of the four-team double-elimination format, the East Division champion played the West Division runner-up, and vice versa.

Bracket

All-Tournament 
Rutgers's Jason Imperial was named Most Outstanding Player, and his teammate Dave Hoehler was named Most Outstanding Pitcher.

References 

Atlantic 10 Conference tournament
Atlantic 10 Conference Baseball Tournament
Atlantic 10 Conference baseball tournament
Atlantic 10 Conference baseball tournament
Baseball in Pennsylvania
College sports in Pennsylvania
History of Berks County, Pennsylvania
Sports competitions in Pennsylvania
Sports in the Delaware Valley
Tourist attractions in Berks County, Pennsylvania